Anodontostoma is a small genus of gizzard shads found in the Indo-Pacific region.  It currently contains three described species.

Species
 Anodontostoma chacunda (F. Hamilton, 1822) (Chacunda gizzard shad)
 Anodontostoma selangkat (Bleeker, 1852) (Indonesian gizzard shad)
 Anodontostoma thailandiae Wongratana, 1983 (Thai gizzard shad)

References
 

Clupeidae
Marine fish genera
Taxa named by Pieter Bleeker